The 2019 One80 L-style World Masters was a major tournament on the BDO/WDF calendar for 2019. It took place from 23 to 28 October at the Circus Tavern in Purfleet, Essex, which hosted the PDC World Darts Championship from 1994 to 2007.

Adam Smith-Neale was the reigning men's champion after defeating Glen Durrant in the previous year's final by 6 sets to 4, but lost in the Last 128 to Hannes Schnier of Austria. Lisa Ashton was the defending women's champion after defeating Casey Gallagher 4 legs to 2 in last year's women final. She defended her title successfully with a 5 to 4 legs final win over Anastasia Dobromyslova.

John O`Shea won his first major title with a 6 sets to 4 win over Scott Waites. He became the third non-seeded World Master in three consecutive years.

The youth tournaments were won by Keane Barry and Katie Sheldon of the Republic of Ireland.

It was the first time three Irish players won the Singles tournaments of the World Masters.

The tournament was beset with problems, including:
Prizemoney was not announced in advance.
The tournament format was changed shortly before the event and the top-16 seeds had to play from the first round instead of receiving a bye to the televised stages.
Several players boycotted the event in protest at the above. Nick Kenny and Wayne Warren were among the seeds who didn't attend.
Other players arrived but found they were not registered as they were not aware they had to register.
The chairman admitted that the original draw was made with fake names, which he said was in case more players showed up. 
The draw was then redone. Brian Cathcart, who never attended the event, was still in the draw for the last-32.
There was a shortage of scorers and volunteers had to be called for.
Participants were asked to sign a contract affirming that they would not enter the 2020 PDC World Darts Championship or its qualifiers, otherwise prizemoney might be withheld or have to be repaid. Some refused to sign and played anyway.
BDO chairman Des Jacklin announced that he would stand down after the 2020 BDO World Darts Championship held in January.

These irregularities led to the BDO, a founder member of the World Darts Federation, being demoted to associate status by the WDF. 

The tournament was the last World Masters organised by the BDO after the collapse of the organisation in September 2020. Following the tournament, the World Darts Federation announced plans to launch the WDF World Masters in 2020, but due to the COVID-19 pandemic these plans were pushed back to 2021, and then 2022.

Men's seeds 

The seedings were finalised on 10 September. For the fourth consecutive year, there were 16 seeds (a decrease from 32 between 2012 and 2015), but with a change from last year, all seeds started playing in the Last 128.

Men's draw (last 32 onwards)

Women's seeds 
It was announced before the start of the event that the Ladies seeds were to rise from 8 to 16.   No reason for the change was given.

Women's draw (last 8 onwards)

References

Sources
Darts for Windows - Live Scoring
British Darts Organisation - Katie Sheldon is the 2019 one80 L-style Girls World Master - World Masters - News
British Darts Organisation - Keane Barry is the 2019 one80 L-style Boys World Master - World Masters - News
British Darts Organisation - World Masters Men's Last 32 Afternoon Session Report - World Masters - News
British Darts Organisation - WORLD MASTERS MEN'S LAST 32 EVENING SESSION REPORT - World Masters - News
British Darts Organisation - Day 2 at the Circus Tavern Order of Play - World Masters - News
British Darts Organisation - Day 2 Afternoon Session report from the Circus Tavern - World Masters - News
British Darts Organisation - DAY 2 Evening SESSION REPORT FROM THE CIRCUS TAVERN - World Masters - News
British Darts Organisation - Finals day at the Circus Tavern Order of play - World Masters - News
 
 

World Masters
World Masters
World Masters (darts)
Purfleet